Andy Díaz (born 25 December 1995) is a Cuban naturalised Italian athlete specialising in the triple jump. He represented his country at the 2017 World Championships finishing seventh in the final. He competed at the 2020 Summer Olympics.

Career
His personal bests in the event are 17.63 metres outdoors (+1.6 m/s, La Habana 2021) and 17.06 metres indoors (Metz 2021). He also has a best of 7.40 metres (+0.4 m/s) in the long jump from 2017.
He became Italian citizen on 23 February 2023.

Achievements

Circuit wins and titles
  Diamond League champion: 2022.

References

External links
 

1995 births
Living people
Cuban male triple jumpers
Italian male triple jumpers
World Athletics Championships athletes for Cuba
Athletes (track and field) at the 2019 Pan American Games
Pan American Games bronze medalists for Cuba
Pan American Games medalists in athletics (track and field)
Medalists at the 2019 Pan American Games
21st-century Cuban people
21st-century Italian people